Salman Zarka is a Druze-Israeli physician and the Director of Ziv Medical Center in Safed, reservist of The Israel Defense Forces in the rank of Colonel, senior lecturer at the Faculty of Social Welfare and Health in the School of Public Health of Haifa University and senior lecturer in the Department of Military Medicine in the military doctors top track of Hebrew University in Jerusalem. In 2019, Dr. Zarka was selected as one of 12 torch-lighters at the annual Independence Day ceremony on Mount Herzl in Jerusalem.

As of July 2021, he has been serving as Israel's COVID czar.

Early life
Salman Zarka was born in 1964 in Peki'in, Israel, to a large Druze family.
In 1982 he began his studies at the School of Medicine in Technion, Haifa, as part of Academic Reserve military program (Atuda).

Military service
After receiving his MD degree he started his military service which lasted over 25 years. Dr. Zarka served as a doctor in an Armored Battalion of the 401st Brigade and as the brigade's medical officer. He served as a doctor in the 36th Division (Ga'ash Formation) and as Head of the military health branch at the Chief Medical Officer headquarters. At 2008 he was promoted to the rank of Colonel and was appointed as Medical Commander of the Northern Command during the tenure of Gadi Eizenkot as the commanding officer. In 2013 he was appointed as the Commander of the IDF Center for Medical Services and the Head of Health Department in the Medical Corps. In March 2013 he founded and commanded the operation of a field hospital on the Israel-Syria border for the treatment of wounded victims of the Syrian Civil War.

Academic
Zarka has a master's degree in epidemiology and public health from the Hebrew University Braun School of Public Health and Community Medicine, he is a graduate of the National Security College, and has a master's degree in political science and national security from the University of Haifa. Serves as a senior lecturer in the Department of Military Medicine at the Hebrew University and as a senior lecturer at the Faculty of Social Welfare and Health in the School of Public Health of Haifa University. At the last year, Dr. Zarka teaches at the Faculty of Medicine at Bar Ilan University.

Dr. Zarka has two specialties: one in the field of public health and the other one in the field of medical management, in which he gained vast experience while serving as an assistant to the Director General of the Ministry of Health, Prof. Ronni Gamzu. In this capacity he led the "Rest in Dignity" program (the purpose of which was to provide dignified burial to the samples remaining at forensic pathology institute at Abu Kabir) and project of medical services upgrade across hospitals in northern Israel (Nahariya, Poria and Ziv) as part of establishment of Safed Medical School.

Medical services
At the time of the IDF Operation Protective Edge, during which he served as Commander of the IDF Center for Medical Services, Dr. Zarka managed the provision of medical services to the soldiers in the operation area, treatment of hospitalized soldiers and the establishment of military hospital in the Erez Crossing intended to provide assistance for the Gaza Strip citizens. 

In 2014, while serving as the Commander of the IDF Center for Medical Services, he suddenly decided to end his military career (although at that time he was a leading candidate for the position of Surgeon General) and to run for the position of the Director of Ziv Medical Center in Safed. He assumed this new role in December 2014. The beginning of his work was followed by a lawsuit filed by doctors who competed against him for the position and lost the tender. The lawsuit alleged that the Civil Service Commissioner was not authorized to approve the late tender application submitted by Dr. Zarka following his participation in Operation Protective Edge. The lawsuit was discussed at the Labour Court, where it was decided to hold a repeated tender, in which Dr. Zarka again won the position of Director of Ziv Medical Center. 

In recent years, Ziv Medical Center has prospered and enjoyed rapid growth, improving the medical services for residents of northern Israel and providing appropriate medical solutions for patients in the periphery without the need to travel long distances. Ziv Medical Center faces another challenge related to preparedness for emergency situations. During the Second Lebanon War, about 1500 wounded patients were treated at the hospital - both soldiers and citizens of the state. In addition, it suffered a direct hit by a rocket. 

In 2016, a Child Health Center was opened within the facility. The Center is located in a reinforced building, comprehensively addresses the needs of northern residents, and is designed to provide initial assistance in emergency events. 
Under the direction of Dr. Zarka, Ziv hospital continues to lead the humanitarian treatment of wounded in Syrian civil war. About 800 patients were treated at Ziv Medical Center from 2013 to 2016, as part of the Israeli humanitarian aid to Syrian citizens.

Publications
Dr. Zarka is publishing a medical book Complicated War Trauma and Care of the Wounded,  based on the experience of the Ziv Medical Center.

See also
Operation Good Neighbor

References

1964 births
Living people
Academic staff of Bar-Ilan University
Arab-Israeli physicians
Hebrew University-Hadassah Braun School of Public Health and Community Medicine  alumni
Academic staff of the Hebrew University of Jerusalem
Israeli military doctors
Israeli Druze
People of the Syrian civil war
University of Haifa alumni
Academic staff of the University of Haifa
Arab citizens of Israel
Druze people